DYSW-TV Channel 39 is a commercial/relay television station owned by Masawa Broadcasting Corporation affiliated with the Sonshine Media Network International. Formerly an affiliate of UNTV. The transmitter is located at Brgy, 10 Purok Mantinlo, KM No. 1 Roxas Avenue Extension, Roxas City, Capiz.

References

Television channels and stations established in 2011
Television stations in Roxas, Capiz